Eugene Thomas Long III (March 16, 1935 – March 13, 2020) was an American philosopher and Distinguished Professor Emeritus of Philosophy in the University of South Carolina. He was also president of the Metaphysical Society of America (1998).

Three days shy of his 85th birthday, Long died at his Richmond, Virginia, home on March 13, 2020, following a three-year battle with pulmonary fibrosis. He is survived by his wife of 60 years, Carolyn, and their two children.

References

1935 births
2020 deaths
20th-century American philosophers
Writers from Richmond, Virginia
University of South Carolina faculty
Philosophy academics
Presidents of the Metaphysical Society of America
Deaths from pulmonary fibrosis
Distinguished professors of philosophy
Distinguished professors in the United States